Çaylı, Shamakhi may refer to:
Çaylı (Chayly Pervyye), Shamakhi, Azerbaijan
Çaylı (Chayly Vtoryye), Shamakhi, Azerbaijan